Thomas Flint may refer to:

 Thomas Barnard Flint (1847–1919), Canadian lawyer and political figure in Nova Scotia
 Thomas Flint (philosopher), adherent of Molinism
 Thomas Flint, co-founder of Irvine Company 
 Thomas Flint Sr. and Thomas Flint Jr., figures in the history of Middleton, Massachusetts